Nizhneomsky District is an administrative and municipal district (raion), one of the thirty-two in Omsk Oblast, Russia. It is located in the east of the oblast. Its administrative center is the rural locality (a selo) of Nizhnyaya Omka. Population: 15,826 (2010 Census);  The population of the administrative center accounts for 30.5% of the district's total population.

References

Notes

Sources

Districts of Omsk Oblast